George E. Read (1838–1910) was an American sailor who received the Medal of Honor for valor in action during the American Civil War.

Biography
Read was born in Rhode Island in 1838. He was awarded his Medal of Honor for gallantry under fire exhibited while crewing the ship's Number 2 gun. 

Read died in 1910 and was buried in Ancient Littleneck Cemetery in East Providence, Rhode Island.

Medal of Honor citation
Rank and organization: Seaman, U.S. Navy. Born: 1838, Rhode Island. Accredited to: Rhode Island. G.O. No.: 45, December 31, 1864

Citation:

Served as seaman on board the U.S.S. Kearsarge when she destroyed the Alabama off Cherbourg, France, 19 June 1864. Acting as the first loader of the No. 2 gun during this bitter engagement, Read exhibited marked coolness and good conduct and was highly recommended for his gallantry under fire by his divisional officer.

See also

List of American Civil War Medal of Honor recipients: Q–S

References

1838 births
1910 deaths
Union Navy sailors
United States Navy Medal of Honor recipients
People of Rhode Island in the American Civil War
American Civil War recipients of the Medal of Honor